The Royal Islamic Strategic Studies Centre is  a research centre affiliated with the Royal Aal al-Bayt Institute for Islamic Thought.

Its publications include:

A Common Word Between Us and You
The Amman Message
Forty Hadith on Divine Mercy
Jihad and the Islamic Law of War
 Warfare in The Qur’an
Body Count
The Holy Qur'an and the Environment
Address to H.H. Pope Benedict XVI at the King Hussein Mosque, Amman, Jordan by H.R.H. Prince Ghazi bin Muhammad bin Talal
Keys to Jerusalem
The 500 Most Influential Muslims

References

External links 
 

Religious tract publishing companies
Companies based in Amman
Islamic education
Islamic organisations based in Jordan